The Houston Pioneer Cemetery is a historic cemetery in Eau Gallie, Florida.  It is located within Rossetter Park off Highland Avenue between Oak Street and Shady Lane near the James Wadsworth Rossetter House.  The cemetery includes graves of original settlers from Eau Gallie such as John Caroll Houston, III and his wife Mary Virginia Houston.  The Houston Memorial Park is also located here with a memorial from 1947 located adjacent to the cemetery.  This memorial dates the first grave at 1865, but no headstone contains that date. John Caroll Houston, IV was buried here.

See also
Historic Rossetter House Museum

Footnotes

Gallery

External links
 Historic Rossetter House Museum
 

Cemeteries in Florida
Eau Gallie, Florida
Protected areas of Brevard County, Florida
1883 establishments in Florida